Argyle Building may refer to:

Argyle Building, Glasgow, in Scotland
Argyle Building (Kansas City, Missouri), listed on the U.S. National Register of Historic Places